George William Robert Burns (25 October 1919 – 20 November 1995) was a New Zealand coxswain who represented his country at the 1938 British Empire Games. 

He won the silver medal as part of the men's coxed four at the 1938 British Empire Games. He was a member of the Petone Rowing Club, and his team members on the 1938 boat were Jim Clayton (stroke), Ken Boswell, John Rigby, and Albert Hope.

References

New Zealand male rowers
Rowers at the 1938 British Empire Games
Commonwealth Games silver medallists for New Zealand
1919 births
1995 deaths
Commonwealth Games medallists in rowing
Coxswains (rowing)
Medallists at the 1938 British Empire Games